The Tiaojishan Formation is a geological formation in Hebei and Liaoning, People's Republic of China, dating to the middle-late Jurassic period (Bathonian-Oxfordian stages). It is known for its exceptionally preserved fossils, including those of plants, insects and vertebrates. It is made up mainly of pyroclastic rock interspersed with basic volcanic and sedimentary rocks. Previously, the Tiaojishan Formation was grouped together with the underlying Haifanggou Formation (also known as the Jiulongshan Formation) as a single "Lanqi Formation." The Tiaojishan Formation forms a key part of the Yanliao Biota assemblage, alongside the Haifanggou Formation.

Age 
Using Argon–argon dating, Wang and colleagues in 2005 dated part of the Tiaojishan Formation to about 160 million years ago, the beginning of the Oxfordian stage, the first stage of the Upper Jurassic epoch. In 2006, a study by Liu and colleagues used U-Pb zircon dating to conclude that the Tiaojishan Formation correlates with the Daohugou Beds, and the complete chronological range of this shared biota dates to between 168 and 164/152 Ma ago. A subsequent study, published in 2008, refined the age range of the formation further, finding that the lower boundary of the Tiaojishan was formed 165 Ma ago, and the upper boundary somewhere between 156 and 153 Ma ago.

Climate
Based on the plant life present in the Tiaojishan Formation, Wang Yongdong and colleagues determined that the climate in Liaoning during the mid Jurassic would have been subtropical to temperate, warm and humid.

Fauna
Beautifully preserved fossils of dinosaurs, pterosaurs, salamanders, insects, arachnids and other invertebrates, conifers, ginkgoes, cycads, horsetails, and ferns, and even the earliest known gliding mammal (Volaticotherium) have been discovered in these rocks.The tuffaceous composition of some rock layers show that this was a volcanic area, occasionally experiencing heavy ashfalls from eruptions. The landscape then was dominated by mountain streams and deep lakes surrounded by forests of gymnosperm trees.

The forests of the Yanliao biota grew in a humid, warm - temperate climate and were dominated by gymnosperm trees. There were ginkgopsids like Ginkoites, Ginkgo, Baiera, Czekanowskia, and Phoenicopsis. There were also conifers like Pityophyllum, Rhipidiocladus, Elatocladus, Schizolepis, and Podozamites. Also, Lycopsids like Lycopodites and Sellaginellities, horsetails (Sphenopsida) like Equisetum, cycads like Anomozamites, and ferns (Filicopsida) like Todites and Coniopteris.

Salamanders

Pterosaurs

Dinosaurs

Lizards

Cynodonts

Arthropods

The following orders are represented in the formation; Ephemeroptera, Odonata, Plecoptera, Blattodea, Orthoptera, Hemiptera, Neuroptera, Coleoptera, Hymenoptera, and Diptera.

An indeterminate aeshnoid (insect) species is known from Liaoning.

Other invertebrates

Flora
Survey based on Wang et al. 2006 unless otherwise noted.

Bennettitales
Cycad-like plants, the most abundant plant group in the formation. 27 species in 11 genera.

Ginkgoales
Prehistoric ginkgo trees, common, with 11 species present in 6 genera.

Pinophyta
Conifers, 5 species present in 4 genera.

Pteridophyta
Leptosporangiate ferns, represented by 17 species in 8 genera, are the second most abundant plant type in the formation.

Other plants 
Cycads, fairly diverse, with 10 species present in 2 genera.

References 

Geologic formations of China
Jurassic System of Asia
Jurassic China
Bathonian Stage
Oxfordian Stage
Sandstone formations
Shale formations
Tuff formations
Coal formations
Coal in China
Formations
Lagerstätten
Paleontology in Liaoning
Paleontology in Hebei